William Lyimo (born 27 October 1953) is a Tanzanian boxer. He competed in the men's light welterweight event at the 1980 Summer Olympics. Lyimo also represented Tanzania at the 1974 British Commonwealth Games, losing his first bout to Ayub Kalule of Uganda.

References

1953 births
Living people
Tanzanian male boxers
Olympic boxers of Tanzania
Boxers at the 1980 Summer Olympics
Commonwealth Games competitors for Tanzania
Boxers at the 1974 British Commonwealth Games
Place of birth missing (living people)
Light-welterweight boxers